Edge Tech Corp (ETC) is a US-based manufacturer and supplier of computer memory upgrades, including DRAM, solid-state drives, USB flash drives, memory cards, and hard disk drives. Edge Tech is headquartered in Ada, Oklahoma and maintains sales, marketing and eCommerce facilities in Addison, Texas.

History
Peripheral Outlet was formed in 1986 by 14-year-old Jeff Thompson, with $2,500 he had saved from his paper route in Ada, Oklahoma. Thompson was named Young Entrepreneur of the Year in 1994 by the U.S. Small Business Administration, and profiled in Fortune magazine.
Other family members were employed in the business, including brother Ryan Thompson who later founded another company.

By 1996 the company's sales had increased by 650% and was named to the Inc. magazine 500 list of the fastest growing private companies. 
Peripheral Outlet incorporated and became Peripheral Enhancements Corporation (PECO).

In 1998 PECO acquired the NewerRam division of Newer Technology and opened offices in Dallas, Texas.

In 1999 PECO obtained ISO 9001 certification.

Peripheral Enhancements Corporation became EDGE Tech Corporation in 2004. It moved to new office space in Ada in 2006. It was named one of the best places to work for small companies in Dallas in 2009.

References

External links
 
 NewerTech website

1986 establishments in Oklahoma
Ada, Oklahoma
Computer companies established in 1986
Computer memory companies
Electronics companies of the United States
Manufacturing companies based in Oklahoma
Privately held companies based in Oklahoma